Rohan Bopanna and Wesley Koolhof were the defending champions, but they decided not to participate this year.

Aslan Karatsev and Andrey Rublev won the title, defeating Marcus Daniell and Philipp Oswald in the final, 7–5, 6–4.

Seeds

Draw

Draw

References

External Links
Main Draw

Qatar ExxonMobil Open - Doubles
Doubles